Ross Gittins AM FRSN (born 1948 in Newcastle, Australia) is an Australian political and economic journalist and author, known for "his ability to make dry, hard-to-understand economics and economic policy relevant".

Early life and education
Ross Roderick Gittins was born 13 February 1948 in Newcastle, New South Wales where his family were living at New Lambton. His parents, Salvation Army officers moved to Sydney and Ross started schooling at Fort Street High School. The family then moved to Bathurst before moving back to New Lambton. Ross completed his secondary schooling at Newcastle Boys High School (196264).

Ross then matriculated to the University of Newcastle where he studied in the Faculty of Economics and Commerce being graduated in 1970 as a Bachelor of Commerce. He had studied part-time for 2 years whilst working with a Newcastle chartered accountant before gaining a Commonwealth Scholarship which enabled him to finish his studies on a full-time basis.

Upon completion of his degree, he moved to Sydney, where he worked for a large firm of chartered accountants.

Finance journalist
Gittins regularly writes for Fairfax publications The Sydney Morning Herald, The Age and The Canberra Times, commentating on underlying economic issues and political economic policies. In 1993 he won the Citibank Pan Asia award for excellence in finance journalism.

In 2003 Gittins wrote that former Prime Minister "Honest John Howard" had been "a tricky chap" on immigration, by appearing "tough" on illegal immigration to win support from the working class, while simultaneously winning support from employers with high legal immigration.

He celebrated his 30th year as the Herald's economics editor in 2008, having assumed the position during the Fraser government in 1978.

Ross Gittins lectures to year 11 and 12 high school students around Australia, in order to share his knowledge and understanding of the Australian economy.

Awards and recognition

Gittins was awarded a Centenary Medal in 2001 for service to economic journalism in Australia and made a Member of the Order of Australia on 26 January 2008 for service to journalism as a commentator on economic theory, policy and behavioural economics, and to the accountancy profession.

In 2011, Gittins was awarded an honorary Doctor of Letters from Macquarie University and in 2012 an honorary Doctor of Science in Economics from the University of Sydney.

Gittins is a Fellow of Chartered Accountants Australia & New Zealand. In 2015 he was appointed an eminent fellow in the practice of economics at the Research School of Economics, Australian National University. In 2017 he was elected a Fellow of the Royal Society of New South Wales, being promulgated by His Excellency, the then Governor of New South Wales, General, the Honourable David Hurley AC DSC(Rtd) in the NSW Government Gazette February 2018; and a Fellow of the Academy of the Social Sciences in Australia. In December 2018 the Australian National University awarded Gittins a Doctor of Letters honoris causa for his "exceptional contribution to journalism and economics in Australia".

Bibliography
 Gittins, Ross: Gittinomics: living the good life without money stress, overwork and joyless consumption, Allen & Unwin, Crows Nest NSW, c2007, 
 Gittins, Ross: Gittins' guide to economics, Allen & Unwin, Crows Nest NSW, 2006. Edition: [4th edition], 
 Tiffen, Rod and Gittins, Ross: How Australia compares, Cambridge University Press, Cambridge, England, 2nd edition, 2009, 
 Gittins, Ross, Martin, P., Irvine, J., Denniss, R., Forsyth, A: The Australian economy : a student's guide to current economic conditions, Warringal Publications, Coburg, VIC, 2009, 
 Gittins, Ross: The Happy Economist : Happiness for the hard-headed, Allen and Unwin, Crows Nest NSW, 2010

References

External links
 Column archives at the Sydney Morning Herald  
 ABC TV interview on covering Australian economy for 40 years
Web page http://www.rossgittins.com

1948 births
Australian accountants
Australian business and financial journalists
Australian financial writers
Australian social democrats
Fellows of the Academy of the Social Sciences in Australia
Fellows of the Royal Society of New South Wales
Lecturers
Living people
People educated at Newcastle Boys' High School
University of Newcastle (Australia) alumni
The Sydney Morning Herald people